Richard Lee Feigen (August 8, 1930 – January 29, 2021) was an American gallery owner.

Early life and education
A native of Chicago, Feigen was the son of a lawyer and a homemaker who, while not themselves collectors, encouraged their son's early acquisitive interests. Feigen purchased his first artwork in 1942, at the age of 11.

Feigen earned a Bachelor of Arts from Yale University in 1952 and a Master of Business Administration from Harvard University in 1954.

Career
He opened his first gallery on Astor Street in Chicago in 1957 and displayed impressionist and surrealist artists from the 20th Century, such as George Grosz, Francis Bacon, Jean Dubuffet, Claes Oldenburg, Joseph Cornell, James Rosenquist, and Ray Johnson. He opened a second gallery in New York City in 1962 and displayed works from Vincent van Gogh, Claude Monet, Pablo Picasso, Max Beckmann, and Constantin Brâncuși. Throughout his career, Feigen sold paintings to the likes of the Louvre, the Metropolitan Museum of Art, the J. Paul Getty Museum, the Museum of Fine Arts, Boston, the National Gallery, and the National Gallery of Art.

Feigen was cast as a version of himself in Oliver Stone's 1987 film Wall Street.

Personal life
Feigen was married three times: to Sandra Elizabeth Canning Walker in 1966, to Margaret (Peggy) Langan-Culver in 1998, and to Isabelle Harnoncourt Wisowaty in 2007. 

He died from complications of COVID-19 in Mount Kisco, New York, on January 29, 2021, at the age of 90.

Books
Dubuffet and the Anticulture. Exh. cat. 1969–1970 New York.
Tales from the Art Crypt: The Painters, the Museums, the Curators, the Collectors, the Auctions, the Art. New York: Knopf, 2000.

Notable exhibitions in New York
1996: A Century of Landscape Painting, England and France 1770–1870

2004–2005: Beckmann/Picasso show with the Jan Krugier Gallery

2010: Richard Wilson and the British Arcadia

2011–2012: Late Medieval Panel Paintings

2015: Ray Johnson's Art World (estate of Ray Johnson, 1927–1995)

References

External links 

Profile by Susan Moore in Apollo, March 2014. 
Oral history at the Archives of American Art, January 9–13, 2009.

1930 births
2021 deaths
Deaths from the COVID-19 pandemic in New York (state)
People from Katonah, New York
Writers from Chicago
Harvard Business School alumni
Yale University alumni
American art dealers
American art collectors